Cyphia is a genus of flowering plants in the bellflower family, native to Africa; and particularly South Africa.  It has been placed in its own subfamily, Cyphioideae. It is closely related to the genus Lobelia. Cyphia comes in shades of white to mauve, whereas lobelias have strong colours of blue to purple. Species in this genus have a bilabiate corolla; with 3 lobes on top and 2 below (as opposed to Lobelia, which has 2 lobes on top and 3 below).

Accepted species:
Cyphia alba N.E.Br. – Zimbabwe
Cyphia alicedalensis E.Wimm. in H.G.A.Engler – South Africa
Cyphia angustifolia Eckl. & Zeyh. ex C.Presl in C.F.Eklon & K.L.P.Zeyher – South Africa
Cyphia aspergilloides E.Wimm.  – South Africa
Cyphia basiloba E.Wimm. in H.G.A.Engler – South Africa
Cyphia belfastica E.Wimm. in H.G.A.Engler  – South Africa
Cyphia bolusii E.Phillips – Eswatini
Cyphia brachyandra Thulin – Tanzania, Malawi
Cyphia brevifolia Thulin – Angola
Cyphia brummittii Thulin – Malawi
Cyphia bulbosa (L.) P.J.Bergius – South Africa
Cyphia comptonii Bond – South Africa
Cyphia corylifolia Harv. – KwaZulu-Natal
Cyphia couroublei Bamps & Malaisse – Congo
Cyphia crenata (Thunb.) C.Presl – South Africa
Cyphia decora Thulin – Malawi
Cyphia deltoidea E.Wimm. in H.G.A.Engler – KwaZulu-Natal
Cyphia digitata (Thunb.) Willd. – Namibia, South Africa
Cyphia elata Harv – South Africa, Lesotho, Eswatini
Cyphia erecta De Wild. – Tanzania, Zambia, Congo, Malawi
Cyphia eritreana E.Wimm. in H.G.A.Engler  – Eritrea, Ethiopia
Cyphia galpinii E.Wimm. in H.G.A.Engler  – South Africa
Cyphia gamopetala J.Duvign. & Denaeyer – Congo 
Cyphia georgica E.Wimm. in H.G.A.Engler  – South Africa
Cyphia glabra E.Wimm.  – South Africa
Cyphia glandulifera Hochst. ex A.Rich. – Eritrea, Ethiopia, Somalia, Kenya, Tanzania, Uganda, Malawi	
Cyphia heterophylla C.Presl in C.F.Eklon & K.L.P.Zeyher – South Africa
Cyphia incisa (Thunb.) Willd.  – South Africa
Cyphia lasiandra Diels – Congo, Burundi, Tanzania, Angola, Malawi, Mozambique
Cyphia linarioides C.Presl in C.F.Eklon & K.L.P.Zeyher – South Africa
Cyphia longiflora Schltr.  – South Africa
Cyphia longifolia N.E.Br. – South Africa
Cyphia longilobata E.Phillips – South Africa
Cyphia longipedicellata E.Wimm. – South Africa
Cyphia maculosa E.Phillips – South Africa
Cyphia mafingensis Thulin – Malawi
Cyphia mazoensis S.Moore – Malawi, Mozambique, Zambia, Zimbabwe
Cyphia natalensis E.Phillips – KwaZulu-Natal
Cyphia nyikensis Thulin – Malawi
Cyphia oligotricha Schltr. – South Africa
Cyphia pectinata E.Wimm. in H.G.A.Engler – Eswatini
Cyphia persicifolia C.Presl in E.H.F.Meyer – South Africa
Cyphia phillipsii E.Wimm. in H.G.A.Engler – South Africa
Cyphia phyteuma (L.) Willd. – South Africa
Cyphia ramosa E.Wimm. in H.G.A.Engler – Free State
Cyphia reducta E.Wimm. – Zimbabwe, Mozambique
Cyphia revoluta E.Wimm. in H.G.A.Engler – South Africa
Cyphia richardsiae E.Wimm. in H.G.A.Engler – Tanzania, Congo, Malawi
Cyphia rogersii S.Moore – Eswatini, South Africa
Cyphia rupestris E.Wimm. in H.G.A.Engler  – Tanzania
Cyphia salteri E.Wimm. in H.G.A.Engler – South Africa
Cyphia schlechteri E.Phillips – South Africa
Cyphia smutsii E.Wimm. in H.G.A.Engler – South Africa
Cyphia stenodonta E.Wimm. in H.G.A.Engler – South Africa
Cyphia stenopetala Diels – South Africa, Botswana
Cyphia stenophylla (E.Wimm.) E.Wimm. in H.G.A.Engler – South Africa
Cyphia stheno Webb in W.J.Hooker – Angola
Cyphia subtubulata E.Wimm. in H.G.A.Engler – South Africa
Cyphia sylvatica Eckl. & Zeyh. – South Africa, Namibia
Cyphia tenera Diels – South Africa
Cyphia transvaalensis E.Phillips – South Africa
Cyphia triphylla E.Phillips – Lesotho, South Africa
Cyphia tysonii E.Phillips – South Africa
Cyphia ubenensis Engl. – Tanzania
Cyphia undulata Eckl. ex C.Presl in C.F.Eklon & K.L.P.Zeyher – South Africa
Cyphia volubilis (Burm.f.) Willd.  – South Africa
Cyphia zeyheriana C.Presl in C.F.Eklon & K.L.P.Zeyher – South Africa

References

Campanulaceae
Campanulaceae genera